Softball was introduced as a World Games sport at the 1981 World Games in Santa Clara and discontinued after the 1985 games in London. It was reintroduced as a women's invitational sport in 2009 in Kaohsiung after it had been removed from the Olympic Games programme, and from 2013 it was again part of the official Program.

Medalists

Men

Women

See also
 Softball at the Summer Olympics women's competitions were held in 1996, 2000, 2004, and 2008
 Women's Softball World Cup

References

 
Sports at the World Games
Softball competitions
World Games